Pavanasapuram is a small village in Tirunelveli district, South India. It is very near to Anaikulam.

Villages in Tirunelveli district